The East Sea, one of the Four Seas, is identified as the body of water east of the mainland according to ancient Chinese geography. In Chinese literature, the Four Seas are a metaphor for the boundaries of China. It contains modern day East China Sea as well as the Yellow Sea and Bohai Sea. 

In Chinese mythology, East Sea is the domain of Ao Guang, the Donghai Longwang (東海龍王), or "the Dragon King of the Eastern Sea", who is responsible for controlling its storms and tides. Supposedly, the Dragon King resides in a large "Dragon Palace", the Donghai Longgong (東海龍宮), located at its bottom.

See also
Dragon King
Mulberry fields (idiom)

References

Asia in mythology
Locations in Chinese mythology
Seas of the Pacific Ocean